Jacques Marty (30 July 1940 – 2 August 2012) was a French boxer. He competed in the men's middleweight event at the 1964 Summer Olympics.

References

1940 births
2012 deaths
French male boxers
Olympic boxers of France
Boxers at the 1964 Summer Olympics
Sportspeople from Neuilly-sur-Seine
Middleweight boxers